Fort Apache may refer to:

Arts and entertainment
 Fort Apache (film), a 1948 John Ford film starring John Wayne
 Fort Apache, The Bronx (film), a crime drama film starring Paul Newman
 Fort Apache Napoli, a 2009 Italian film
 Fort Apache Studios, an American music recording studio
 Fort Apache, a fictional location in the TV series The Adventures of Rin Tin Tin

Places
Fort Apache Historic Park
 Fort Apache Indian Reservation, Arizona, U.S.
 Fort Apache, Arizona, an unincorporated community in Navajo County, Arizona, U.S.
 Fuerte Apache, a neighbourhood of Ciudadela near the city of Buenos Aires, Argentina
 "Fort Apache, The Bronx", a former nickname of NYPD's  41st Precinct located in the South Bronx

Other uses
 Fort Apache (hostile place), a metaphorical term for a place providing shelter from hostile action

See also

 Battle of Fort Apache, 1881